Jojo Rabbit is an American-New Zealand-Czech comedy-drama film adapted by Taika Waititi from Christine Leunens' 2008 novel Caging Skies. Waititi stars the imaginary version of Adolf Hitler only visible to 10-year-old Hitler Youth member Jojo Betzler (Roman Griffin Davis). When Jojo finds out that his mother Rosie (Scarlett Johansson) is hiding a Jewish girl (Thomasin McKenzie) in their attic, he starts interacting with her, slowly questioning the antisemitic teachings he was taught all along. The film premiered at the Toronto International Film Festival on September 8, 2019, winning the People's Choice Award. Upon its worldwide release, it was considered a box office success, though its premise as a Nazi comedy was found to be not of everyone's taste. Using a weighted average, review aggregator Metacritic sampled 57 critics and assigned the film a score of 58 out of 100 indicating "mixed or average reviews". Polls from CinemaScore and PostTrak showed that the film was more favored by general filmgoers.

Jojo Rabbit, amongst its cast and crew, won 14 awards, including an Academy Award for Best Adapted Screenplay directed towards Waititi, making him the first Māori indigenous person to win the award. At the 92nd Academy Awards, it also received 5 nominations, including Best Supporting Actress for Scarlett Johansson and Best Picture, wherein it failed to the South Korean Parasite. Newcomer Davis also received various accolades, including a nomination for Best Actor – Motion Picture Musical or Comedy at the 77th Golden Globe Awards, and winning Best Young Performer at the 25th Critics' Choice Awards, a category which McKenzie and supporting actor Archie Yates were also nominated for. At the Costume Designers Guild Awards 2019, Mayes C. Rubeo won the award for Excellence in Period Film; while at the Academy Awards was nominated for Best Costume Design. Editor Tom Eagles, production designer Ra Vincent, and set decorator Nora Sopková rounds up the film's Academy accolades. Mihai Mălaimare Jr. and Michael Giacchino were also given nominations for the film's cinematography and score, respectively.

List

References

External links 
 

Jojo Rabbit